The 1928 Kansas gubernatorial election was held on November 6, 1928. Republican nominee Clyde M. Reed, who defeated former representative Charles Frederick Scott, lieutenant governor De Lanson Alson Newton Chase, and Secretary of State Frank Joseph Ryan for the Republican nomination, defeated Democratic nominee Chauncey B. Little with 65.60% of the vote.

General election

Candidates
Major party candidates 
Clyde M. Reed, Republican
Chauncey B. Little, Democratic

Other candidates
Henry L. Peterson, Socialist

Results

References

1928
Kansas
Gubernatorial